The Westward Ho is a high-rise building in Phoenix, Arizona. The 16-story building, which is 208 ft (63m) to the roof, held the title of tallest building in Arizona for over 30 years until the completion of the Meridian Bank Tower in 1960.

The building primarily served as a hotel from its grand opening in 1928 until its official closure on April 7, 1980. The facility also housed several offices and restaurants, including one on the 16th floor called Top of the Ho. There were also several gathering rooms in the hotel, the Turquoise Room on the 2nd floor where many marriage receptions were held, and a large convention center adjacent to the main hotel which could seat 1,600 called the Thunderbird Room where many of Phoenix's big events took place.

After the hotel closed in 1980, the new owners converted the building into a subsidized housing complex for the elderly and mobility impaired. Currently, the facility houses as many as 320 residents in 289 rooms which were recently renovated to make them more accessible for apartment residents.

History
Construction of the hotel was announced in spring 1927 under the originally planned name, Roosevelt Hotel. The project was financed by Sutherlin-Barry & Company of New Orleans, Louisiana, for owner G. L. Johnson of Chicago, Illinois. The architectural team who designed the hotel were Fisher, Lake, and Traver, who had also designed the Roosevelt Hotel in Hollywood, California a few years before. The hotel was to be operated by Johnson's Pacific Hotel Company. Work came to a halt in early 1928 with only 6-stories completed. In April, J. V. McNeil Company of Los Angeles, California, were awarded a contract to complete the hotel.

In September 1928, Charles V. Bob of New York City purchased all issued and outstanding shares of the Pacific Hotel Company from G. L. Johnson, complete financing of the hotel was transferred to Bob, including construction, furnishings, and equipment. August Heckscher loaned $275,000 to Bob prior to the purchase, in return for the loan, Bob pledged 10,000 shares of Pacific Hotel Company to Heckscher. Following the transfer of ownership, the hotels future name was changed from Roosevelt to Westward Ho. On September 20, Southwestern Supply Company of Phoenix was awarded a $100,000 contract for the heating and air-conditioning of Western Ho. The hotel officially opened its doors on December 15, 1928.

According to librarian at the Sun City Museum developer Del Webb got his start hanging doors at the hotel during its construction. His namesake company would go on to build an expansion to the hotel.

A 5-story annex was built west of the original structure by the Del E. Webb Construction Company in 1948.

The  steel tower and  antenna on top of the building were erected in 1949 to broadcast Phoenix's first television station, KPHO-TV channel 5. In 1960, KPHO moved to its new transmitter on South Mountain. After use in the 1970s by KXTC 92.3 FM, the antenna on Westward Ho now functions as a cell tower.

In 1982, the National Register of Historic Places recognized the Westward Ho as a historic building. In 2003, the building was acquired by the Phoenix Preservation Partnership, a Rhode Island-based group of investors.

Hotel Westward Ho
The building has had quite a few owners in its time, beginning with G. L. Johnson in 1927, who sold it to Charles V. Bob and August Heckscher in 1928 while still under-construction. Heckscher took over full control of the Westward Ho in the early 1930s, and after many years of successful ownership died April 26, 1941, leaving his life's real estate to his wife Virginia Henry Curtiss, who died just a few months later.  The hotel was put up for sale and eventually purchased by partners John B. Mills and R. H. Hawn of Federal Underwriters, Inc, Dallas, Texas in 1943. They purchased the hotel without ever actually seeing it in person, persuaded by W. R. Wayland, president of the Westward Ho since 1937. Wayland was already partnered with the two in their Texas hotel interests, working with their holding company Federal Underwriters, later Associated Federal Hotels, of which Mills was Chairman of the Board. They already owned several other large hotels in Texas, including the former William Penn Hotel in Houston, Texas, which was demolished in 2006, Cliff Towers Hotel in Dallas, and the Hotel Hawn in Temple, Texas. There was no change in management or policy following the change of ownership.

In December 1972, after nearly 30 years of ownership by the Mills family, the hotel was sold to Leisure Inns and Resorts Inc. of Cleveland, Ohio. In March, after encountering financial difficulties and a foreclosure notice, Leisure Inns sold the property to Minneapolis banker Deil Gustafson, owner of four banks in Minnesota and the Tropicana Hotel in Las Vegas, Nevada.

In May 1975, management announced that the facility would no longer operate as a hotel and would become a retirement residence, in August, a foreclosure suit was filed against Gustafson by Republic National Life Insurance Company of Dallas, who claimed the owners were late on mortgage payments and were failing to operator as a hotel, part of an original agreement. The Republic National Life Insurance Company purchased the hotel at a Maricopa County sheriff's auction in June 1976, under the terms that Gustafson had until December 10, 1976 to pay a $2,044,800 purchase price for the hotel and an approximate penalty of $180,000, if Gustafson failed to pay before the deadline the sheriffs office was to give Republic the deed. Hours before the deadline Gustafson got a hold of the deed through the Maricopa County Recorder's office and filed for protection from creditors under federal bankruptcy laws, the judge in the case blocked Maricopa County Sheriff's Office from handing the deed over. In March, Gustafson's lawyer and an attorney for Republic National came to an agreement that $2,504,908 was to be paid to Republic Nation by March 1, 1977 or the stay order on the Sheriffs office would be lifted and Republic National become new owner. The payment was not made and ownership of the Westward Ho was passed to Republic National Life Insurance Company on March 1, 1977. In December 1977, the building was sold to Al and Marie Seidel and their partners, R&C Trust.

Post hotel era
After a rough decade for the hotel, it was again sold in December 1977 to Al and Marie Seidel and their partners, Roger Rudin and Tom Caprino of R&C Trust and Westward Ho Associates with plans of using federal funding to turn Westward Ho into a home for the aged. Renovations began mid-1980 to convert the former hotel into a federally-subsidised housing complex for the elderly, the first residents began moving in the following year. The hotel is currently serving as housing for either the physically or mentally disabled.

The building was again thoroughly remodeled between 2003 and 2004 to improve the living conditions of the residents and restore the buildings historical facade. At an estimated cost of $9 million, window-mounted air-conditioners were removed and a new centralized air-conditioning unit was installed. Additionally, approximately 450 exterior windows were replaced with replicas of the originals, the exterior was power washed, stucco was repaired, and the building was repainted to match its original beige color. Upgrades to the automatic fire sprinkler and fire alarm systems were also made.

Gallery

In popular culture
The Westward Ho appears in the opening sequence of the 1960 Alfred Hitchcock film Psycho. The clip fades in centered on Hotel San Carlos, which is located on the northwest corner of Central and Monroe. The former Arizona Bank Building (under-construction) can be seen just west of Hotel San Carlos, and Camelback Mountain can be seen in the background. When the camera pans south to the right you can see the Heard Building in the foreground with its antenna, which was often confused to be the Westward Ho antenna. Behind the Heard Building you can see the Professional Building.

In the 1998 Gus Van Sant remake of Psycho, the camera zooms into a window on the 8th floor of the Westward Ho.

In the 1972 film Pocket Money, actor Paul Newman throws a television set off the 4th story balcony of a hotel room in the J wing of the Westward Ho. Lee Marvin and Strother Martin can also be seen inside the same hotel room. Other areas of the hotel used in the film included the lobby, patio, J Wing stair and walkways, and the hotel barber shop. In the film, the hotel was supposed to be located in Mexico.

In the 1956 film Bus Stop starring Marilyn Monroe, the parade scenes were filmed on Central Ave in front of the entrance.

Famous people
 Vice President Richard Nixon had breakfast at the Westward Ho prior to giving a speech in the Thunderbird Room October 15, 1960.
 Then-actor (and future President) Ronald Reagan was a guest speaker for the Phoenix Chamber Of Commerce in the Thunderbird Room on May 30, 1961.
 President John F. Kennedy stopped by the Westward Ho for dinner in honor of Senator Carl Hayden on November 17, 1961.
 Senator Ted Kennedy campaigned for Presidential candidate John Kerry at the Westward Ho on the afternoon of January 30, 2004.

See also
 Phoenix Historic Property Register
 List of tallest buildings in Phoenix

References

External links

 Westward Ho on Emporis
 Multimedia website on the Westward Ho compiled by graduate students at Arizona State University's Walter Cronkite School of Journalism.

Residential skyscrapers in Phoenix, Arizona
Hotel buildings completed in 1927
Hotel buildings on the National Register of Historic Places in Arizona
National Register of Historic Places in Phoenix, Arizona